Proxhyle is a genus of moths in the subfamily Arctiinae. The genus was erected by Hervé de Toulgoët in 1959.

Species
 Proxhyle cinerascens Toulgoët, 1959
 Proxhyle comoreana Toulgoët, 1959
 Proxhyle vadoni Toulgoët, 1953

References

Lithosiini